Catharine Rose Gale is a British epidemiologist. She is Professor of Cognitive Epidemiology in the Faculty of Medicine at the University of Southampton. She is also Reader in Cognitive Epidemiology in the Department of Psychology and co-leader of the Cognitive Epidemiology research group in the Centre for Cognitive Ageing and Cognitive Epidemiology at the University of Edinburgh. She received her PhD from the University of Southampton's MRC Environmental Epidemiology Unit.

References

External links
Faculty page at the University of Southampton
Faculty page at the University of Edinburgh

British women epidemiologists
Living people
British women academics
Alumni of the University of Southampton
Academics of the University of Edinburgh
Academics of the University of Southampton
Year of birth missing (living people)